Miss Iraq in America is an annual beauty pageant, first held in 2013. The competition has been presided over and supervised by Yalla Fan, an artistic production company founded by Joe Rasho. The competition requires the contestants to be United States residents of Iraqi descent between the ages of 18 and 27 and unmarried. The competition is designed to promote Iraqi culture and introduce Iraqi women to the world.

History
The first Miss Iraq-America ceremony was held in 2013 in Chicago, Illinois. There were fifteen contestants competing for the title. The winner was Lavin Hama,followed by first-runner up, Alina Oraha and second-runner up Sjaa Al-Otaibi. The contestants vied for the title in front of a panel of judges: producer Billy Hado, Iraqi hero Julius Isak, Dasco Charwani, celebrity decorator Per Mimi, decorator and designer Ghada Ajami, Dr. Rachel Corcis, and Activist Samira Kirkawes.

The ceremony started with a dance inspired by hopes for peace. The pageant hosts introduced participants to the audience. The contest included video interviews where each woman spoke about their home city in Iraq and Iraq as a country. The ceremony also included culturally relevant song performances and interaction with the audience in the theatre. The pageant and subsequent celebration lasted until the early morning hours, with a show conclusion presented by the 19-year-old winner, Lavin Hama.

On November 26, 2014, the Miss Iraq-America Award ceremony was held for the second consecutive year in the state of Michigan and was won by Melinda Tuma, a student at the College of Pharmacy. The first runner-up was Farah Sto, followed by Lavinia Issa, Rita Ghannam, and Marie Curcis.

In the 2014 pageant, the opening ceremony again consisted of an expressionist dance symbolizing peace. The participants, along with visiting artist, Megan Hormuz, sang "Ghali Ya Iraq" by the Lebanese artist Rabie Baroud. Artist, Ismail Faruji, opened the concert with the song "Raise Your Head to the End of Iraq." The beauty pageant was attended by a selection of famous Iraqi artists including Dean Asmro, and Melad Yunus.

The next Miss Iraq-America contest was held in Bellagio Hall on Warren Street in Michigan on 12 March 2016. The 2016 pageant was attended by several acclaimed artists, most notably Hussam Al-Rassam. Sarah Idan won the Miss Iraq-America 2016 title with Lord Hanna and Anwar Hussein as first and second runner up respectively.

Titleholders

See also
 Iraqi beauty pageants
 Miss Iraq 2017

Notes and references

External links
 

Beauty pageants in Iraq
Beauty pageants in the United States
Recurring events established in 2013
2013 establishments in Illinois
Iraq–United States relations